Marshall Township may refer to:

Arkansas
 Marshall Township, White County, Arkansas, in White County, Arkansas

Illinois
 Marshall Township, Clark County, Illinois

Indiana
 Marshall Township, Lawrence County, Indiana

Iowa
 Marshall Township, Louisa County, Iowa
 Marshall Township, Marshall County, Iowa
 Marshall Township, Pocahontas County, Iowa
 Marshall Township, Taylor County, Iowa

Michigan
 Marshall Township, Michigan

Minnesota
 Marshall Township, Mower County, Minnesota

Missouri
 Marshall Township, Platte County, Missouri
 Marshall Township, Saline County, Missouri

Nebraska
 Marshall Township, Clay County, Nebraska

North Dakota
 Marshall Township, Williams County, North Dakota, in Williams County, North Dakota

Ohio
 Marshall Township, Highland County, Ohio

Pennsylvania
 Marshall Township, Pennsylvania

Township name disambiguation pages